The Sri Lanka cricket team toured Australia for four tour matches, two Test matches and the 2007–08 Commonwealth Bank Series from 27 October 2007 to 7 March 2008.

Squad lists

Ben Hilfenhaus was added after Tait was withdrawn with an elbow injury.
Sujeewa de Silva was added as cover for Welegedara.

Test series

1st Test

2nd Test

Commonwealth Bank Series

Tour Matches

Cricket Australia Chairman's XI

Queensland

Prime Minister's XI

Tasmania

See also
Australian cricket team in 2007–08

References

2007 in Australian cricket
2008 in Australian cricket
2007–08 Australian cricket season
2007-08
International cricket competitions in 2007–08
2007 in Sri Lankan cricket
2008 in Sri Lankan cricket